Polymeria calycina, also known as slender bindweed, is a species of prostrate herbaceous vine native to northern and Eastern Australia. The species grows in savanna woodlands, open forests and occasionally grasslands.

References

Flora of Queensland
Convolvulaceae